Valeria Volodymyrivna Bondarenko (Ukrainian: Валерія Володимирівна Бондаренко; born 20 June 1982) is a former Ukrainian tennis player, the older sister of tennis players Alona and Kateryna Bondarenko.

In her career, she won eight doubles titles on the ITF Circuit. Her career-high singles ranking is world No. 636, reached in 2002. Her best doubles ranking is 189, achieved on 16 August 2004.

Bondarenko retired from professional tennis in 2008.

ITF Circuit finals

Doubles: 21 (8–13)

References

External links
 
 

1982 births
Ukrainian female tennis players
Living people
Sportspeople from Kryvyi Rih
21st-century Ukrainian women